The Last Confederate: The Story of Robert Adams is a 2007 American war film starring Julian Adams, Amy Redford, Gwendolyn Edwards, Eric Holloway, Joshua Lindsey, Mickey Rooney and Tippi Hedren. The movie, released in 2007 by ThinkFilm, centers on the life of Captain Robert Adams II and his Northern bride, Eveline McCord, and received 10 awards on the film festival circuit.  The film was produced by Weston Adams, Julian Adams and Billy Fox. The film was titled  Strike the Tent by the filmmakers, and on the film festival circuit, and was changed by the distributor before the release.

Plot 
The love story of Confederate Captain Robert Adams II and a northern girl, Eveline McCord.  The story begins with Captain Adams falling in love with Eveline, a governess from Pennsylvania who moved to South Carolina to work for Robert's first cousin, Governor James Hopkins Adams.  As they fall in love in antebellum South Carolina, Captain Adams is launched into the outbreak of the American Civil War, despite the protests of Eveline.  The film follows Adams through battles in Virginia, and his capture and subsequent imprisonment in the Federal Military Prison in Elmira, New York.  The film was written and produced by the descendants of Robert and Eveline.

The film addresses the issue of slavery in a number of scenes. One in particular shows Adams encountering an African American woman in the woods at night who has just buried her child. She tells Adams “You’ve made a hard bed for yourself, and now you’ve got to lie in it.” Another scene shows Eveline speaking with the character of Elizabeth about her coming freedom and what she will do.

Cast

Release 
The film premiered at the 2005 Long Island International Film Expo. It was given a limited release, opening in theaters in Los Angeles, Nashville, Houston, Columbia, S.C., Charleston, S.C. and other cities.

Critical response 
Michael Ordoña said in the Los Angeles Times that the film's "unapologetically romantic views of war and the Old South leave a bitter aftertaste". Paul Welcom of L.A. Weekly called it "a vanity project of the most indulgent order".

Home media 
The Last Confederate: The Story of Robert Adams was released on DVD in 2007, courtesy of ThinkFilm. Bonus features include a featurette, outtakes, and deleted scenes.

Accolades 

 Breckenridge Festival of Film Award for Best of the Fest Drama — Winner 
 Great Lakes Film Festival Best Narrative Feature Award — Winner 
 Great Lakes Film Festival Best Actor Award (Julian Adams) — Winner
 Long Island International Film Expo Jury Award — Winner 
 Park City Film Music Festival Audience Choice Award — Winner
 Solstice Film Festival Best Cinematography Award — Winner
 Tahoe Reno International Film Festival Best New American Film Award — Winner
 Westwood Film Festival Sony 'Like No Other' Award — Winner

References

External links
 
 
 The Last Confederate: The Story of Robert Adams
 ThinkFilm
 Los Angeles Times review of "The Last Confederate"
 Monsters and Critics review of "The Last Confederate"
 S.C.L.O.S. review of "The Last Confederate"

2007 films
American war drama films
2000s war drama films
American Civil War films
Films scored by Atli Örvarsson
2000s English-language films
2000s American films